The 2018–19 season is Wydad AC's 79th season in its existence and the club's 63rd consecutive season in the top flight of Moroccan football. They have competed in the Botola, the Champions League, Arab Club Champions Cup, and the Throne Cup.

Competitions

Overview

{| class="wikitable" style="text-align: center"
|-
!rowspan=2|Competition
!colspan=8|Record
!rowspan=2|Started round
!rowspan=2|Final position / round
!rowspan=2|First match
!rowspan=2|Last match
|-
!
!
!
!
!
!
!
!
|-
| Botola Pro

| 
| style="background:gold;"| Winners
| 7 September 2018
| 9 June 2019
|-
| Throne Cup

| Round of 32
| Semi-finals
| 2 September 2018
| 2 November 2018
|-
| 2018 Champions League

| Group stage
| Quarter-finals
| 17 July 2018
| 21 September 2018
|-
| 2019 Champions League

| First round
| style="background:silver;"| Runners–up
| 15 December 2018
| 31 May 2019
|-
| Club Champions Cup

| First round
| Second round
| 24 September 2018
| 8 November 2018
|-
! Total

Botola Pro

League table

Results summary

Results by round

Matches

Moroccan Throne Cup

Arab Club Championship Cup

First round

Second round

2018 Champions League

Group stage

Group C

knockout stage

Quarter-finals

2018–19 Champions League

First round

Group stage

Group A

knockout stage

Quarter-finals

Semi-finals

Final

Squad information

Playing statistics

|-
! colspan=14 style=background:#dcdcdc; text-align:center| Goalkeepers

|-
! colspan=14 style=background:#dcdcdc; text-align:center| Defenders

|-
! colspan=14 style=background:#dcdcdc; text-align:center| Midfielders

|-
! colspan=14 style=background:#dcdcdc; text-align:center| Forwards

|-
! colspan=14 style=background:#dcdcdc; text-align:center| Players transferred out during the season

Goalscorers
Includes all competitive matches. The list is sorted alphabetically by surname when total goals are equal.

Transfers

In

Out

Notes

References

Wydad AC seasons
Wydad Casablanca